The James Robert Williams House is a historic house located at 310 E. Main St. in Carmi, Illinois. The house was built in 1896 for James Robert Williams, a U.S. Representative and political ally of William Jennings Bryan. Prominent residential architect George Franklin Barber designed the red brick house in a blend of the Romanesque Revival and Queen Anne styles. The house has three corner towers, two with crenellated tops and one with a double bell roof; the towers cause the building to resemble a castle. The house's front entrance is surrounded by an arched porch with a balcony on its roof. A loggia is located above the entrance on the house's third level.

The house was added to the National Register of Historic Places on January 29, 1987.

References

Houses on the National Register of Historic Places in Illinois
Queen Anne architecture in Illinois
Romanesque Revival architecture in Illinois
Houses completed in 1896
Houses in White County, Illinois
National Register of Historic Places in White County, Illinois